The Pink Palace Family of Museums is a group of museums maintained by the City of Memphis and Memphis Museums, Inc. They display collections of historical, educational and technological significance.

The following museums are part of the group:

The Pink Palace Museum and Planetarium in Memphis.
Coon Creek Science Center, the site of Upper Cretaceous fossil finds and a museum in Adamsville, Tennessee
Lichterman Nature Center, an arboretum/nature center/wildlife museum in Memphis
Mallory-Neely House, a historic home in the Victorian Village of Memphis
Magevney House, a historic home in the Victorian Village of Memphis

The Pink Palace Museum and Planetarium houses a museum of local cultural and natural history, the Crew Training International (CTI) 3D Giant Theater and the Sharpe Planetarium.

See also
List of museums in Tennessee

References

Museums in Memphis, Tennessee
Museum organizations
Culture of Memphis, Tennessee